The Northern Association was a Class D level minor league baseball league. The eight-team league had franchises based in Illinois and Iowa.  The league began and ended play in 1910, disbanding on July 19, 1910. The Joliet Jolly-ites moved to Sterling on June 21. The Clinton and Freeport teams disbanded on June 28; The Elgin and Kankakee franchises disbanded on July 11.

Baseball Hall of Fame member Casey Stengel and Fritz Maisel were two league players who reached Major League Baseball after playing in the Northern Association.

Cities represented
 Clinton, Iowa: Clinton Teddies 1910
 Decatur, Illinois: Decatur Commodores 1910
 Elgin, Illinois: Elgin Kittens 1910
 Freeport, Illinois: Freeport Pretzels 1910
 Jacksonville, Illinois: Jacksonville Jacks 1910
 Joliet, Illinois: Joliet Jolly-ites 1910
 Kankakee, Illinois: Kankakee Kays 1910
 Muscatine, Iowa: Muscatine Pearl Finders 1910
 Sterling, Illinois: Sterling Infants 1910

Standings & statistics
 1910 Northern Association   

The league disbanded July 19.

Further reading
The Encyclopedia of Minor League Baseball: Second and Third Editions.

References

Defunct minor baseball leagues in the United States
1910 establishments in Illinois
1910 establishments in Iowa
Sports leagues established in 1910
Baseball leagues in Iowa
Baseball leagues in Illinois
1910 disestablishments in Illinois
1910 disestablishments in Iowa
Sports leagues disestablished in 1910